The Meralco Bolts 3x3 are a Philippine 3x3 basketball team which competes in the PBA 3x3, organized by the Philippines' top-flight professional league, Philippine Basketball Association (PBA). The team is affiliated with the Meralco Bolts, a member franchise of the PBA.

History
The Meralco Bolts, competing as Meralco Bolts 3x3, are among the participating PBA franchise teams in the inaugural 2021 PBA 3x3 season.

Current roster

References

PBA 3x3 teams
2021 establishments in the Philippines
Basketball teams established in 2021